Montgomeryshire is a constituency in Wales represented in the House of Commons of the UK Parliament.

Created in 1542, it elects one Member of Parliament (MP), traditionally known as the knight of the shire, by the first-past-the-post system of election. Since 2019, Craig Williams has served as the MP for Montgomeryshire, when he succeeded fellow Conservative Glyn Davies.

The Montgomeryshire Senedd constituency was created with the same boundaries in 1999 (as an Assembly constituency).

Boundaries

The seat is based on the ancient county of Montgomeryshire, in the principal area of Powys. One of Britain's most rural and isolated constituencies, Montgomeryshire elected Liberal or Liberal-affiliated candidates from 1880, until a Conservative victory in the 1979 general election. In the 1983 general election it was the only seat in England and Wales where a sitting Conservative MP was unseated, while nationally the party's seat majority increased. However, in 2010, the Conservatives won and held the seat in 2015 and 2017, with an increased majority. The seat was officially known as Montgomery before 1997. It is the only seat in Wales never to have elected a Labour MP.

Until 1918 this seat, in common with many others, contained an enclaved seat, which comprised the boroughs of Montgomery, Llanfyllin, Llanidloes, Newtown and Welshpool. This seat survived the Redistribution of Seats Act 1885 which abolished many similar seats. The seat was finally abolished in 1918 and absorbed into the wider Montgomery seat, where it remains.

Proposed constituency changes
Under proposed constituency boundary changes announced in September 2016, ahead of the next general election, the seat was to be partitioned, the northern half including Welshpool to be merged with Clwyd South to form a new seat of South Clwyd and North Montgomeryshire; most of the southern including Newtown was to be merged with the Brecon and Radnor seat to form a seat renamed as Brecon, Radnor and Montgomery, and the wards of Llanidloes and Blaen Hafren merged into the Ceredigion constituency which would form part of a new seat called Ceredigion and North Pembrokeshire. However, the general elections of 2017 and 2019 were fought on existing boundaries.

Members of Parliament

1542–1604

1604–present

Elections

Elections in the 19th century

Elections in the 1830s

 Caused by Williams-Wynn's appointment as a Commissioner for the Affairs of India

Elections in the 1840s

Elections in the 1850s

 Caused by Williams-Wynn's death.

Elections in the 1860s

 Caused by Williams-Wynn's death.

Elections in the 1870s

Elections in the 1880s

Elections in the 1890s

 Caused by Rendel's elevation to the peerage.

Elections in the 20th century

Elections in the 1900s

Elections in the 1910s 

Davies was endorsed by the Coalition Government, but refused to accept the coupon.

Elections in the 1920s

Elections in the 1930s

Elections in the 1940s

Elections in the 1950s

Elections in the 1960s

Elections in the 1970s

Elections in the 1980s

In 1983 this was Labour's worst performance in Wales and the only seat where Labour won less than 12.5% and lost their £150 deposit. The threshold for retaining deposits was lowered to 5% in 1985.

Elections in the 1990s

Elections in the 21st century

Elections in the 2000s

Elections in the 2010s

note: The David Rowlands who stood here is different from the David Rowlands who stood in Newport East at this election for UKIP.

Of the 213 rejected ballots:
156 were either unmarked or it was uncertain who the vote was for.
24 voted for more than one candidate.
33 had want of official mark.

See also
 Montgomeryshire (Senedd constituency)
 List of parliamentary constituencies in Powys
 1962 Montgomeryshire by-election
 List of parliamentary constituencies in Wales

Notes

References

Further reading
 Robert Beatson, A Chronological Register of Both Houses of Parliament (London: Longman, Hurst, Res & Orme, 1807) A Chronological Register of Both Houses of the British Parliament, from the Union in 1708, to the Third Parliament of the United Kingdom of Great Britain and Ireland, in 1807
 D Brunton & D H Pennington, Members of the Long Parliament (London: George Allen & Unwin, 1954)
 Cobbett's Parliamentary history of England, from the Norman Conquest in 1066 to the year 1803 (London: Thomas Hansard, 1808) titles A-Z
 F W S Craig, British Parliamentary Election Results 1832-1885 (2nd edition, Aldershot: Parliamentary Research Services, 1989)
 Robert Waller, The Almanac of British Politics (1st edition, London: Croom Helm, 1983)

External links
Politics Resources (Election results from 1922 onwards)
Electoral Calculus (Election results from 1955 onwards)
2017 Election House Of Commons Library 2017 Election report
A Vision Of Britain Through Time (Constituency elector numbers)

Montgomeryshire
Parliamentary constituencies in Mid Wales
Constituencies of the Parliament of the United Kingdom established in 1536
Politics of Powys